Russell Lake or Lake Russell may refer to:

Canada
Russell Lake (Nova Scotia), a small lake in Dartmouth, Nova Scotia
Russell Lake West, Nova Scotia an area of eastern Dartmouth, Nova Scotia

United States

Lake Russell (prehistoric), a prehistoric lake in Mono Basin, California
Russell Lake (Minnesota), a lake in Crow Wing County
Russell Lake (New York), a lake in Delaware County
Richard B. Russell Lake, a man-made lake created by the Richard B. Russell Dam in South Carolina
Glacial Lake Russell, a prehistoric lake formed at the toe of the Vashon Glacier in Puget Sound, Washington

See also
 Lake Russell (coach) (1898–1980), American football coach